Soultaker is the second EP from German futurepop band Blutengel. It was released as a single CD and 2x CD limited edition. The bonus disc to the limited edition is a recording of a live performance from K17, Berlin on 22/23 May 2009 entitled Live in Berlin.

Track listing

References

External links
Soultaker at Discogs

2009 EPs
Blutengel albums